American Institute of Bangladesh Studies is a United States-based think tank and research institute, studying Bangladesh and related topics. It provides funding to scholars and students who are conducting research on Bangladesh.

History
American Institute of Bangladesh Studies was founded in 1989 by Professor Craig Baxter of Juniata College. Its founding was supported by professors from Columbia University, Glassboro State College, Pennsylvania State University, University of Chicago, University of Pennsylvania, and University of Wisconsin.

The institute signed an agreement with the government of Bangladesh, through which the government of Bangladesh provided financial aid to scholars studying Bangladesh related topics. From 1991 to 1992 the institute signed an agreement with the United States Information Agency to encourage educational exchanges between Bangladesh and the United States. In 1993 the institute joined the Council of American Overseas Research Centers. 

Craig Baxter served as the president of the institute from 1989 to 1998. It was one of the supporters of the Bangladesh in the 21st Century conference in Harvard University in 2008. President of the Institute Shelly Feldman, also a professor at Cornell University, was a moderator of a conference titled Water, waves and weather: Climate change and the future of South Asia in Dhaka, Bangladesh on 20 June 2011. AIBS has signed MOU with The University of Dhaka, Bangladesh University of Engineering and Technology and Shahjalal University of Science and Technology.

References

1989 establishments in the United States
Council of American Overseas Research Centers
Research institutes in Bangladesh
Bangladesh–United States relations